Johann Hornung ( 1660 Tallinn – 1715) was a Baltic-German Lutheran clergyman and language enthusiast.

He worked as a sacristan in several Estonian churches, including Põltsamaa (1692-1698) and Karula (1698-1715).

With Adrian Virginius, he translated New Testament into North Estonian. 1694 he published religious book "Önsa Luterusse Laste Öppetuse ...", and he was a co-author of the religious book "Ma Kele Koddo ning Kirgo Ramatu".

His most important work was Latin-language Grammatica Esthonica ... which gave the overview of grammar of the North Estonian language.

Further reading
 A. Saareste. Piibli keel ja rahvakeel. – Eesti Keel 1939, 7–8
 L. Aarma. Johann Hornungi grammatikast ning tema ja Bengt Gottfried Forseliuse koostööst. – Keel ja Kirjandus 1996, 6

References

1660 births
1715 deaths
Baltic-German people
Estophiles
17th-century German Lutheran clergy
Estonian Lutheran clergy
German translators
People from Tallinn
18th-century German Lutheran clergy